Stylidium leptorrhizum is a dicotyledonous plant that belongs to the genus Stylidium (family Stylidiaceae). It is an herbaceous annual plant that grows from 8 to 25 cm tall. Oblanceolate or elliptical leaves, about 10-20 per plant, form a basal rosette with stems absent. The leaves are generally 14–60 mm long and 3–9.5 mm wide. This species produces 1-3 scapes per plant. Inflorescences are 8–25 cm long and produce pink or mauve flowers that bloom from May to August in their native range. S. leptorrhizum is endemic to the Kimberley region of Western Australia and the Victoria River district of the Northern Territory. Its typical habitat has been reported as sandy soils along creeks or billabongs. S. leptorrhizum is most closely related to S. multiscapum. When reviewing section Debilia, Anthony Bean reduced the recently described S. barrettorum to synonymy with S. leptorrhizum after examining the type specimen.

See also 
 List of Stylidium species

References 

Carnivorous plants of Australia
Flora of the Northern Territory
Eudicots of Western Australia
leptorrhizum
Asterales of Australia
Taxa named by Ferdinand von Mueller